The SGH-F700, marketed as the Ultra Smart F700, is a mobile phone manufactured by Samsung. Using Vodafone as its network provider, the phone was first introduced at the 3GSM World Congress that was held in February 2007. Sales to the European market started November 2007.

The phone has a 3.2" color display and incorporates a touch screen/touch pad interaction system and a slide-out QWERTY key pad. The phone contains a 3.15 megapixel camera (early reports claimed a 5-megapixel sensor). Furthermore, the handset is HSDPA and Bluetooth 2.0 compatible and possesses USB and microSD memory slots. A Korean design patent for this black, rectangular, round-cornered phone was filed by Samsung in December 2006 prior to the release of the image of the iPhone but after the release of the HTC TyTn which it resembles with its rectangular design and slide out keyboard.

The touchscreen allows the control of the entire handset. The "Croix UI" was awarded the iF Communication Design Award for 2007. A Trusted Reviews article said that the Ultra Smart F700 "kicks iPhone's butt."

The phone was also introduced as the Samsung U940 Glyde on Verizon Wireless in May 2008.

The F700 was succeeded by the Samsung F490 in 2008.

Specifications
Networks: GSM 900/1800/1900, UMTS 2100 MHz
Data Connectivity: GPRS, EDGE, UMTS (3G), HSDPA
Display: 440 x 240 pixel, 262k color with resistive touch screen
Camera: 3.15 megapixels with video, flash and auto-focus
Multimedia: MPEG4, H.263, H.264, MP3, AAC+, eAAC+, Real
Memory: microSD/SDHC (T-Flash)
Input: Touch screen, Predictive Text Input, sliding QWERTY keyboard
Connectivity: USB, Bluetooth, 3.5 mm jack

See also
Samsung P520 Giorgio Armani
Samsung G800
Samsung i900 Omnia
Samsung U900 Soul
LG Viewty
LG Prada
Nokia N95
iPhone

References

External links
 Samsung Official Website
 Samsung F700 at WikiSpecs

F700
Mobile phones introduced in 2007
Slider phones